Marc Pedersen (born 31 July 1989) is a Danish retired professional football player.

Club career

Early years
In 2007, he went from the youth team in FC Midtjylland, where he was captain, to Vejle Boldklub. Here he was part of the successful team which was promoted to the best Danish youth league in the fall of 2007. On 1 January 2008 he joined the senior first team squad in Vejle Boldklub.

Djurgårdens IF 
Marc Pedersen became Djurgården last signing before the 2012 season of Allsvenskan. He did a promising pre-season and was in the premier of the league against IF Elfsborg away rewarded a spot in the starting eleven. In the second half he scored on a corner. He made a total of 17 allsvenskan appearances for Djurgården, leaving in 2013 for FC Fredericia.

Retirement
After playing no games for SønderjyskE in over a year due to a knee injury, Pedersen announced his retirement on 23 October 2020.

References

External links
 SønderjyskE profile
 Danish Superliga Profile

1989 births
Living people
Danish men's footballers
Danish expatriate men's footballers
Vejle Boldklub players
Djurgårdens IF Fotboll players
Danish Superliga players
Allsvenskan players
FC Fredericia players
SønderjyskE Fodbold players
Randers FC players
People from Vejle Municipality
Expatriate footballers in Sweden
Danish expatriate sportspeople in Sweden
Association football defenders
Sportspeople from the Region of Southern Denmark